Egorlykskaya is a former airbase of the Russian Air Force located  south-east of Zernograd, Rostov Oblast, Russia.

The base was home to the 325th Independent Helicopter Regiment between 1992 and 2010 with the Mil Mi-8 (ASCC: Hip), Mil Mi-6 (ASCC: Hook) & Mil Mi-26 (ASCC: Halo).

References

Russian Air Force bases